is a 1957 color Japanese film directed by Hiroshi Inagaki. Other English titles include: Yagyu Bugeicho – Ninjitsu part 1, Secret Scrolls, Yagyu Secret Scrolls Part I.

It was followed by a sequel in 1958, .

Cast 
 Toshirō Mifune as Tasaburo
 Kōji Tsuruta as Senshiro
 Yoshiko Kuga as Yuhime
 Mariko Okada as Rika
 Denjiro Okochi as Lord Yagyu
 Kyōko Kagawa as Oki
 Senjaku Nakamura as Matajuro
 Hanshiro Iwai as Iyemitsu
 Akihiko Hirata as Tomonori 
 Eijirō Tōno as Fugetsusai
 Jotaro Togami as Jubei
 Akio Kobori
 Nobuko Otowa
 Shin Otomo
 Koshiro Matsumoto

References

External links 
 
 

1957 films
1958 films
1950s action films
Japanese action films
Samurai films
Films set in Edo
Films directed by Hiroshi Inagaki
Films produced by Tomoyuki Tanaka
1950s Japanese films